Protoconodonts are an extinct taxonomic group of conodonts or, possibly, Chaetognaths.

Chaetognaths (also known as arrow worms) were thought possibly to be related to some of the animals grouped with the conodonts. The conodonts themselves, however, are thought to be related to the vertebrates. It is now thought that protoconodont elements (e.g., Protohertzina anabarica Missarzhevsky, 1973), are probably grasping spines of chaetognaths rather than the oropharyngeal elements of conodonts. Previously chaetognaths in the Early Cambrian were only suspected from these protoconodont elements (for example Phakelodus), but the more recent discoveries of body fossils have confirmed their presence then.

References 

 Middle and Upper Cambrian Protoconodonts and Paraconodonts from Hunan, South China. Dong Xi-Ping and Stig M. Bergström, Palaeontology, September 2001, Volume 44, Issue 5, pages 949–985, 
 On the evolution and histology of some Cambrian protoconodonts, paraconodonts and primitive euconodonts. Dong Xiping, Science in China Series D: Earth Sciences, July 2004, Volume 47, Issue 7, pages 577–584, 
 Ion microprobe U–Pb dating and Sr isotope measurement of a protoconodont. Yuji Sano, Kosaku Toyoshima, Akizumi Ishida, Kotaro Shirai, Naoto Takahata, Tomohiko Sato and Tsuyoshi Komiya, Journal of Asian Earth Sciences, Volume 92, 1 October 2014, Pages 10–17,

External links 
 
 

Conodont taxonomy
Cambrian conodonts
Prehistoric jawless fish orders